George Anthony Sifakis is a former United States federal government official and government relations professional. Sifakis is currently CEO of IdeagenGlobal.com, which convenes global leaders to develop partnerships and solutions to the world's most troubling issues.

Following his role on the Presidential Transition, assisting with the confirmation process of Wilbur Ross as Secretary of Commerce, Sifakis was appointed by President Trump on January 23, 2017, to be Special Assistant to the President and Deputy Director of the Office of Public Liaison, responsible for engaging the business community, including CEOs of the Fortune 500, non-profit and public sector leaders.

On March 6, 2017, Sifakis was appointed by President Trump as Assistant to the President and Director of the Office of Public Liaison, and one of approximately 20 senior White House staff directly reporting to the White House Chief of Staff, Reince Priebus. On August 18, 2017, multiple Trump administration sources acknowledged that Sifakis would be departing the White House in September.

Early life and education
Sifakis is Greek Orthodox. He received his BA from Rhode Island College and obtained a Paralegal certification from Northeastern University. In 2000, he received his Master of Science in Political Science from the Suffolk University Graduate School of Government. Sifakis also completed the Harvard Kennedy School Executive Education program on Governance and attended the Southern New England School of Law.  George and his wife Adriana, live in Alexandria, Virginia with their three children, George II, Alexandra and Evangelia.

Government career
Sifakis was a member of the George W. Bush White House and the first Director of Public Liaison and Assistant to the President for the Trump Administration reporting to Chief of Staff Reince Priebus.  For President and focused on congressional relations.

In November 2016, Sifakis was named to the Department of Commerce "landing team" as part of the transition process for President Donald Trump. Trump originally announced his intention to appoint Anthony Scaramucci to oversee the Office of Public Engagement and Intergovernmental Affairs in his administration, pending a review of Scaramucci's finances by the Office of Government Ethics. Sifakis joined the Administration as Special Assistant to the President and Deputy Director of Public Liaison on January 23, 2017, and was subsequently appointed Assistant to the President and later Director of the Office of Public Liaison on March 6, 2017.

An official White House statement, as reported by The Wall Street Journal's Michael C. Bender in an official Twitter post on August 18, 2017, included Sifakis' originally planned mid-September departure:

White House Statement from Sarah Huckabee Sanders on August 18 from WSJ: "This has been a long-planned departure – George has been a loyal member of the Trump Administration and we are very grateful for his dedicated service and appreciate George's leadership and effective outreach to key constituencies across the country.  The Office of Public Liaison has a very robust schedule already set moving forward into the fall and will continue pushing forward on the President's agenda. Johnny DeStefano will serve as the interim director of this office following George's departure in mid-September."

On September 15, 2017, Politico reported that Presidential Personnel Director John DeStefano would temporarily serve as interim Director of the Office of Public Liaison when Sifakis returned to the private sector at the end of the month.

References

1969 births
George W. Bush administration personnel
Living people
Trump administration personnel
Virginia Republicans